Cherry Blossom is the fifth studio album by the British pop rock band The Vamps. It was released on 16 October 2020 via EMI Records, and includes the single "Married in Vegas". The album debuted atop the UK Albums Chart, becoming the Vamps' second number-one album in their home country. It is promoted by a concert tour that begun on 6 September 2021.

Background
The band wrote "half an album quickly" 18 months before the release of the album, in early 2019, but scrapped all of the planned material and started over. Early in 2020, the band sent their completed album to their label, believing that they had a strong collection of "bangers and ballads" to mark what they regarded as the second part of their career, using the cherry blossom title and imagery as a symbol of "rebirth", but they were not entirely certain about which song should be released as the lead single.

In an interview with Vents Magazine, Brad Simpson explained: "I went on a Zoom call with Lostboy. We had a few beers and then four hours later 'Married in Vegas' was birthed." James McVey also said, "I was playing Playstation with my mates and it was about 11pm and I was pretty drunk too actually. Then Brad FaceTimed me and he was like 'I've just written this song!'." "Married in Vegas" then became the lead single and was added to the previously completed album.

Singles
"Married in Vegas" was released as the lead single from the album on 31 July 2020. Its release was accompanied by an official music video posted to The Vamps' YouTube channel, directed by Dean Sherwood.

Track listing

Personnel

 Bradley Simpson – lead vocals, songwriter, bass, guitar, backing vocals 
 Tristan Evans – lead guitar, songwriter, drums, producer, programming, backing vocals 
 Connor Ball – songwriter, bass guitar, backing vocals 
 James McVey – bass, songwriter, engineer, guitar, piano, producer, programming, recording, backing vocals 
 James Abrahart – songwriter, backing vocals
 Luke Burgoyne – mixing assistant
 Dan Grech-Marguerat – mixing, programmer
 Svante Halldin – songwriter
 Stuart Hawkes – mastering engineer
 Jakob Hazell – songwriter
 Charles Hicks – mixing assistant
 Jack & Coke – bass, guitar, keyboards, piano, producer, programming, recording, strings
 Lostboy – bass, drum programming, keyboards, producer, programming, recording
 Tom Mann – songwriter
 Jordan Riley – bass, composer, drums, guitar, keyboards, piano, producer, programming, recording, backing vocals
 Peter Rycroft – songwriter

Charts

See also
 List of UK Albums Chart number ones of the 2020s

References

2020 albums
The Vamps (British band) albums
Albums produced by Jordan Riley
Virgin EMI Records albums